Bloomsbury, also known as the Roger Johnson House, is a sandstone house in southern Frederick County, Maryland. The house was occupied by Roger Johnson, brother of Maryland governor Thomas Johnson, who established Bloomsbury Forge nearby. The property includes the remains of log slave quarters and a rare example of an early log barn.

Bloomsbury was listed on the National Register of Historic Places in 2000.

References

External links
, including 2006 photo, at Maryland Historical Trust

Houses on the National Register of Historic Places in Maryland
Houses in Frederick County, Maryland
National Register of Historic Places in Frederick County, Maryland
Slave cabins and quarters in the United States
Thomas Johnson family